Maurice E. Starkey (December 3, 1901 - November 27, 2006) was, at age 104, one of the last American surviving veterans of the World War I era. He joined the United States Navy in July 1919, and  served in the early days of the U.S. submarine corps aboard two K-class submarines, the USS K-3 and USS K-4 that operated along the U.S. eastern coastline during and after the war.

After leaving the service he saw much of the United States by hopping freight trains for many years.  He married twice, and lived in California for some time while working as a chef.  He claimed to have held a job as a chef for a hotel restaurant owned by Gene Autry, and once cooked for restaurant customer Howard Hughes. Starkey settled near family in Royersford, Pennsylvania in 1967 and continued working until his retirement.

Maurice lived with his nephew in the last years of his life, and died in the hospital near his home in Royersford just six days before his 105th birthday.

See also

References
Article on Mr. Starkey from the Pottstown Mercury
Maurice Starkey death notice in the Pottstown Mercury

1901 births
2006 deaths
American centenarians
United States Navy personnel of World War I
Men centenarians
People from Montgomery County, Pennsylvania